The Sioux City metropolitan statistical area, as defined by the United States Census Bureau, is an area consisting of five counties in three states – Iowa, Nebraska, and South Dakota, anchored by the city of Sioux City, Iowa. As of the 2010 census, the MSA had a population of 168,825 (though a 2017 estimate placed the population at 182,608). In the future, Wayne County would be considered by some people and politicians as an additional sixth county.

Counties
Woodbury County, Iowa
Plymouth County, Iowa
Dakota County, Nebraska
Union County, South Dakota
Dixon County, Nebraska
Wayne County, Nebraska

Communities

Places with more than 80,000 inhabitants
Sioux City, Iowa (Principal city)

Places with 9,000 to 15,000 inhabitants
South Sioux City, Nebraska
Le Mars, Iowa

Places with 1,000 to 5,000 inhabitants
Akron, Iowa
Beresford, South Dakota 
Dakota City, Nebraska
Elk Point, South Dakota
Kingsley, Iowa
Moville, Iowa
North Sioux City, South Dakota
Ponca, Nebraska
Remsen, Iowa
Sergeant Bluff, Iowa
Sloan, Iowa
Wakefield, Nebraska
Wayne, Nebraska

Places with 500 to 1,000 inhabitants
Alcester, South Dakota
Anthon, Iowa
Correctionville, Iowa
Emerson, Nebraska
Hinton, Iowa 
Homer, Nebraska
Jefferson, South Dakota
Lawton, Iowa
Merrill, Iowa

Places with less than 500 inhabitants

Unincorporated places
Alsen, South Dakota
Altona, Nebraska
Climbing Hill, Iowa
Garryowen, South Dakota
Nora, South Dakota
Richland, South Dakota
Seney, Iowa
Spink, South Dakota
Willis, Nebraska

Townships

Woodbury County, Iowa

Dixon County, Nebraska

Union County, South Dakota

Demographics

As of the census of 2000, there were 143,005 people, 53,586 households, and 36,735 families residing within the MSA. The racial makeup of the MSA was 87.40% White, 1.58% African American, 1.54% Native American, 2.31% Asian, 0.04% Pacific Islander, 5.19% from other races, and 1.93% from two or more races. Hispanic or Latino of any race were 10.17% of the population.

The median income for a household in the MSA was $39,084, and the median income for a family was $45,638. Males had a median income of $30,799 versus $22,162 for females. The per capita income for the MSA was $18,650.

The Sioux City Human Rights Commission is an impartial governmental agency that works to protect the rights of the diverse population who live and work in Sioux City.

Combined statistical area
The Sioux City–Vermillion combined statistical area (CSA) is made up of five counties in three states: Iowa, Nebraska, and South Dakota. The statistical area includes one metropolitan area and one micropolitan area. As of the 2000 Census, the CSA had a population of 156,503 (though a July 1, 2009 estimate placed the population at 157,850).

Metropolitan statistical areas (MSAs)
Sioux City, Iowa (Woodbury County, Iowa; Plymouth County, Iowa; Dakota County, Nebraska; Dixon County, Nebraska; Wayne County, Nebraska; and Union County, South Dakota)
Micropolitan statistical areas (μSAs)
Vermillion (Clay County, South Dakota)

Media
Sioux City, Iowa has been featured in an Independent Lens series documenting bullying.

The Sioux City metropolitan area is also featured in the book 100 Things to Do in Sioux City & Siouxland Before You Die by Lindsay Hindman (Reedy Press, Sept. 2020)

See also
Iowa census statistical areas
Nebraska census statistical areas
Siouxland
South Dakota census statistical areas

References

 
Woodbury County, Iowa
Plymouth County, Iowa
Dakota County, Nebraska
Dixon County, Nebraska
Union County, South Dakota
Metropolitan areas of Iowa
Metropolitan areas of South Dakota
Metropolitan areas of Nebraska